Jan Konůpek (October 10, 1883 in Mladá Boleslav – March 13, 1950 in Prague) was a Czech painter, illustrator, and engraver. A list of his graphic works comprises 1448 works and more than 600 book illustrations. He is among the three greatest known Czechs for interwar art, alongside František Kobliha and František Drtikol.

Studies
From 1903 to 1906, Jan Konůpek studied architecture at Prague Polytechnical Institute in Prague but under the influence of Pavel Janák and Václav Vilém Štech, he switched to art. From 1906 to 1908, he studied in Professor Maximilian Pirner's studio.

Art
Being one of the founding members of Sursum, a Czech second-generation symbolist movement group, he was draw inspiration from medieval mysticism, and Gothic and Baroque architecture. His works from early 20th century, influenced by symbolism and Gustav Klimt, are considered his best. He illustrated symbolist literature as well as works by Karel Jaromír Erben (Kytice) and Karel Hynek Mácha (Máj) and many others.

Gallery

References

1883 births
1950 deaths
20th-century Czech painters
Czech male painters
People from Mladá Boleslav
20th-century Czech male artists
Czechoslovak painters